Terry McGurrin (born November 5, 1968) is a Canadian voice actor, comedian, writer, and producer from Ottawa, Ontario. He was the story editor for the 2011 YTV show Scaredy Squirrel. He has most recently been story editing and executive producer for the reboot of Total Drama Island, Total DramaRama, Total Drama: All-Stars, Total Drama: Pahkitew Island and The Ridonculous Race (in which he also voices the role of the host, Don). He has recently been writing episodes of The ZhuZhus, and voices Drew and Travis in Norman Picklestripes.

McGurrin has also toured extensively as a stand-up comedian and has entertained the Canadian Forces stationed overseas 12 times to date. He participated in the Canadian Improv Games. He has taped three comedy specials that were featured on CTV, has received eight Gemini and Canadian Screen Award nominations, five nominations at the Canadian Comedy Awards, and one nomination at the WGC Screenwriting Awards. In 2014 he won an ACTRA Award for his voice work as Scaredy Squirrel. McGurrin is also the current voice actor of Snoopy starting from 2019's Snoopy in Space.

Life and career 
McGurrin was born and raised in Ottawa, Ontario. He started his acting career in 1988 in an episode of CBS Summer Playhouse. McGurrin was the voice of Squidguts and Coach Mountain for the first two seasons of Medabots, as well as various voices. In 6teen, McGurrin voiced Jonesy Garcia in the series from 2004 to 2010. Earlier, in 2006, he voiced Yubby and Max in Pandalian and Kianu Kole in Stoked.

He later voiced Bolts and the Black Knight in Bolts and Blip, Scaredy Squirrel in the television series of the same name, Dilweed in Numb Chucks, and as Don in Total Drama Presents: The Ridonculous Race, in which he also served as the co-developer and the series' producer. In Dot., he voiced Dad. He also voiced Lex Hatcher in the Abby Hatcher series. He also voiced Drew and Travis in Norman Picklestripes and Glen in one episode of Cyberchase. Starting from 2019's Snoopy in Space, McGurrin has been the current voice actor for Snoopy from the Peanuts comic strips created by Charles M. Schulz. McGurrin also reprised his role for Snoopy in The Snoopy Show.

As of 2005, McGurrin has been married to Elizabeth Whitmere. Terry had also done radio commercials for Vonage phone service.

Filmography

Television

Video games

References

External links

Animal impersonators
Canadian male comedians
Canadian male radio actors
Canadian male television actors
Canadian male voice actors
Canadian sketch comedians
Canadian stand-up comedians
Living people
Male actors from Ottawa
1968 births